Admiral Young may refer to:

George Young (Royal Navy officer) (1732–1810), British Royal Navy admiral
James Young (Royal Navy officer, born 1717) (1717–1789), British Royal Navy admiral
James Young (Royal Navy officer, born 1762) (1762–1833), British Royal Navy vice admiral
Lucien Young (1852–1912), U.S. Navy rear admiral
William Young (Royal Navy officer, born 1751) (1751–1821), British Royal Navy admiral
William Young (Royal Navy officer, born 1761) (1761–1847), British Royal Navy vice admiral

See also
Jonathan Young (commodore) (1826–1885), U.S. Navy commodore, preceding the use of the rank of admiral